Trudge is an EP by the American post-punk band Savage Republic, released in 1985 on PIAS Recordings. It has been reissued, since 1990, accompanied by Ceremonial.

Track listing and personnel
All selections written by Mark Erskine, Thom Furhmann, Greg Grunke, Bruce Licher and Ethan Port.
Side One
 "Trudge" - 7:16
 Ethan Port - monotone guitar, chant, percussion
 Greg Gunke - lead bass, chant
 Bruce Licher - bass, lead vocals, percussion, chant
 Mark Erskine - drums, chant
Side Two
 "Trek" - 8:21
 Ethan Port - vocals, metal horn, shakers, percussion
 Greg Gunke - monotone guitar
 Thom Fuhrmann - keyboards
 Bruce Licher - bass, percussion
 Mark Erskine - drums, percussion
 "Siege" - 4:21
 Ethan Port - vocals, metal percussion
 Greg Gunke - monotone guitar
 Bruce Licher - lead bass, percussion
 Thom Fuhrmann - bass
 Mark Erskine - drums, percussion
 "Assembly" - 4:43
 Bruce Licher - monotone guitar, vocals
 Greg Gunke - guitar
 Thom Fuhrmann - keyboards, vocals, trombone
 Mark Erskine - drums, percussion
 Ethan Port - metal percussion

Production and additional personnel
Stephan Barbery – art direction
Ethan James – mixing
Savage Republic – production

Release history

References

External links 
 

1985 EPs
Savage Republic albums
PIAS Recordings EPs